SBS Sport is the name given to the Special Broadcasting Service's sport's programming broadcast on SBS Television and SBS Radio.

Television & Streaming

SBS currently holds the broadcast rights to a range of sports, which are broadcast on SBS, SBS Viceland and NITV.

Current

Past

Sports News Programs
 On The Ball
 The World Game
 Toyota World Sport
 The Woggabaliri Footy Show
 SBS Speedweek
 Cycling Central

Awards
Sports coverage and programs made by SBS Sport have been won and been nominated for several awards at the Logie Awards. They include: 
 1998: Won the Most Outstanding Sports Coverage for the Australia v Iran World Cup Qualifier
 1999: Nominated in the Most Outstanding Sports Coverage for the FIFA World Cup 
 1999 Logies: Nominated for the Most Outstanding Sportscaster (to: Les Murray)

See also

ABC Sport
Seven Sport
Nine's Wide World of Sports
10 Sport
List of Australian television series
List of longest running Australian television series
Sports broadcasting contracts in Australia

References

External links
Official Site

 
Special Broadcasting Service
1980 establishments in Australia
Sports television in Australia
Sports divisions of TV channels